Uspenka is the name of several inhabited localities in Russia.

Altai Krai
As of 2012, two rural localities in Altai Krai bear this name:
Uspenka, Loktevsky District, Altai Krai, a selo and the administrative center of Uspensky Selsoviet of Loktevsky District;
Uspenka, Tabunsky District, Altai Krai, a selo in Serebropolsky Selsoviet of Tabunsky District;

Astrakhan Oblast
As of 2012, one rural locality in Astrakhan Oblast bears this name:
Uspenka, Astrakhan Oblast, a village and the administrative center of Uspensky Selsoviet of Akhtubinsky District

Republic of Bashkortostan
As of 2012, two rural localities in Altai Krai bear this name:
Uspenka, Arkhangelsky District, Republic of Bashkortostan, a selo in Krasnokurtovsky Selsoviet of Arkhangelsky District;
Uspenka, Blagoveshchensky District, Republic of Bashkortostan, a selo in Izyaksky Selsoviet of Blagoveshchensky District;

Belgorod Oblast
As of 2012, two rural localities in Belgorod Oblast bear this name:
Uspenka, Gubkinsky District, Belgorod Oblast, a selo in Gubkinsky District;
Uspenka, Volokonovsky District, Belgorod Oblast, a selo in Volokonovsky District;

Kurgan Oblast
As of 2012, one rural locality in Kurgan Oblast bears this name:
Uspenka, Kurgan Oblast, a village in Polovinsky District

Kursk Oblast
As of 2012, three rural localities in Kursk Oblast bear this name:
Uspenka, Kastorensky District, Kursk Oblast, a selo in Kastorensky District;
Uspenka, Kurchatovsky District, Kursk Oblast, a selo in Kurchatovsky District;
Uspenka, Timsky District, Kursk Oblast, a selo in Timsky District;

Mari El
As of 2012, one rural locality in Mari El bears this name:
Uspenka, Mari El, a village in Orshansky District;

Perm Krai
As of 2012, one rural locality in Perm Krai bears this name:
Uspenka, Perm Krai, a village in Chusovskoye Urban Settlement;

Volgograd Oblast
As of 2012, one rural locality in Volgograd Oblast bears this name:
Uspenka, Volgograd Oblast, a village in Nekhayevsky District;